The 2001 Volta a Catalunya was the 81st edition of the Volta a Catalunya cycle race and was held from 21 June to 28 June 2001. The race was won by Joseba Beloki of the ONCE team.

Teams
Seventeen teams of up to eight riders started the race:

 
 
 
 
 
 
 
 
 
 
 
 
 Mercury–Viatel

Route

General classification

References

2001
Volta
2001 in Spanish road cycling
June 2001 sports events in Europe